The 2007–08 SEC women's basketball season began with practices in October 2007, followed by the start of the 2007–08 NCAA Division I women's basketball season in November. Conference play started in early January 2008 and concluded in March, followed by the 2008 SEC women's basketball tournament at the Sommet Center in Nashville, Tennessee.

Preseason

Preseason All-SEC teams

Coaches select 5 players
Players in bold are choices for SEC Player of the Year

Rankings

SEC regular season

Postseason

SEC tournament

Honors and awards

All-SEC awards and teams

References

 
Southeastern Conference women's basketball seasons